Callomphala lucida, common name the bright liotia, is a species of small sea snail, a marine gastropod mollusk in the family Skeneidae.

Description
This species has a white, shining, pellucid, depressed, shell with the aperture right in front.

Distribution
This marine species occurs off New South Wales, Victoria, and Tasmania, Australia.

References

 Cotton, B. C., 1959. South Australian Mollusca. Archaeogastropoda. W.L. Hawes, Adelaide.. 449 pp., 1 pl.
 Iredale, T. & McMichael, D.F., 1962. A reference list of the marine Mollusca of New South Wales. Mem. Aust. Mus., 11:0–0.

External links

lucida
Gastropods described in 1864